Caesar and Cleopatra is a 1945 British Technicolor film directed by Gabriel Pascal and starring Vivien Leigh and Claude Rains. Some scenes were directed by Brian Desmond Hurst, who took no formal credit. The picture was adapted from the play Caesar and Cleopatra (1901) by George Bernard Shaw, produced by Independent Producers and Pascal Film Productions and distributed by Eagle-Lion Distributors.

Upon release, Caesar and Cleopatra failed to earn back its colossal budget. John Bryan was nominated for an Oscar for Best Art Direction.

Plot
Aging Julius Caesar takes possession of the Egyptian capital city of Alexandria and tries to resolve a feud between the young princess Cleopatra and her younger brother Ptolemy. Caesar develops a special relationship with Cleopatra and teaches her how to use her royal power.

Cast

 Vivien Leigh as Cleopatra
 Claude Rains as Caesar
 Stewart Granger as Apollodorus
 Flora Robson as Ftatateeta
 Francis L. Sullivan as Pothinus
 Basil Sydney as Rufio
 Cecil Parker as Britannus
 Raymond Lovell as Lucius Septimus
 Anthony Eustrel as Achillas
 Ernest Thesiger as Theodotus
 Anthony Harvey as Ptolemy
 Robert Adams as Nubian Slave
 Olga Edwardes
 Harda Swanhilde as Cleopatra's Lady Attendants
 Michael Rennie as 1st Centurion
 James McKechnie as 2nd Centurion
 Esme Percy as Major Domo
 Stanley Holloway as Belzanor
 Leo Genn as Bel Affris
 Alan Wheatley as Persian
 Anthony Holles as Boatman
 Charles Victor as 1st Porter
 Ronald Shiner as 2nd Porter
 John Bryning as Sentinel
 John Laurie as 1st Auxiliary Sentinel
 Charles Rolfe as 2nd Auxiliary Sentinel
 Felix Aylmer as 1st Nobleman
 Ivor Barnard as 2nd Nobleman
 Valentine Dyall as 1st Guardsman
 Charles Deane  as 2nd Guardsman

Production
Filmed in Technicolor with lavish sets, the production was reported to be the most expensive film ever made at the time, costing £1,278,000 (or £ at  value), or US$ million (or US$ at inflation-adjusted value) at contemporary exchange rates. Caesar and Cleopatra held that record until Duel in the Sun was produced in 1946.

Director Gabriel Pascal ordered sand from Egypt in order to achieve the proper cinematic colour. The production ran into delays because of wartime restrictions. During the shoot, Vivien Leigh, who was pregnant, tripped and suffered a miscarriage. The incident triggered Leigh's manic depression, leading to her emotional breakdown, and halted production for five weeks.

The film was described as a "box office stinker" at the time and almost ended Pascal's career. It was the first Shaw film made in colour, and the last film version of a Shaw play during his lifetime. After Shaw's death in 1950, Pascal produced Androcles and the Lion, another Shaw-derived film, in 1952.

Reception

Box office
According to trade papers, the film was a "notable box office attraction" at British cinemas. According to Kinematograph Weekly, the top British box-office draw for 1946 was The Wicked Lady.

The film earned $1,363,371 in the United States, making it one of the more popular British films ever released there. However, the film's receipts fell short of initial expectations. Variety estimated that Rank lost $3 million (or $ at  value) on the film after marketing, distribution, prints, insurance rights, and wages were taken into account.

See also
 Cultural depictions of Julius Caesar
 Cultural depictions of Cleopatra VII

References
Notes

Bibliography
 Vermilye, Jerry. (1978) The Great British Films, Citadel Press, pp. 97–101.

External links
 
 
 
 
 
Review of film at Variety
  (Newsreel)
 Film Facts
 Pascal with Jean Simmons at premiere 13 December 1945

1945 films
1945 romantic comedy films
British epic films
British romantic comedy films
1940s English-language films
Depictions of Julius Caesar on film
Depictions of Cleopatra on film
Films based on works by George Bernard Shaw
British films based on plays
Films set in ancient Rome
Films set in Egypt
United Artists films
Films directed by Gabriel Pascal
Films produced by Gabriel Pascal
Films scored by Georges Auric
1940s British films